A big year is a personal challenge or an informal competition among birders who attempt to identify as many species of birds as possible by sight or sound, within a single calendar year and within a specific geographic area. Popularized in North America, big years are commonly carried out within a single U.S. state or Canadian province, or within larger areas such as the Lower 48 contiguous states, within the official American Birding Association (ABA) area, or sometimes the entire globe. The ABA big year record of 840 species was set by Andrew Pochonita of Southern California in 2019. The big year world record of 6,852 species was set in 2016 by Arjan Dwarshuis of the Netherlands.

History of North American big years

The wide publication in 1934 of the first modern field guide by Roger Tory Peterson truly revolutionized birding. However, in that era, most birders did not travel widely. The earliest known continent-wide Big Year record was compiled by Guy Emerson, a traveling businessman, who timed his business trips to coincide with the best birding seasons for different areas in North America. During his best year, in 1939, he saw 497 species. In 1952, Emerson's record was broken by Bob Smart, who saw 515 species.

In 1953, Roger Tory Peterson and James Fisher took a 30,000 mile road trip visiting the wild places of North America. In 1955, they told the story of their travels in a book and a documentary film, both called Wild America. In a footnote to the book, Peterson claimed "My year's list at the end of 1953 was 572 species." In 1956, a 25-year-old Englishman named Stuart Keith, following Peterson and Fisher's route, compiled a list of 594 species, a record that stood for fifteen years.

In 1971, 18-year-old Ted Parker, in his last semester of high school in southeastern Pennsylvania, extensively birded the eastern seaboard of North America. That September, Parker enrolled in the University of Arizona in Tucson and found dozens of Southwestern U.S. and Pacific coast specialties, ending the year with a list of 626 species.

The 1969 foundation of the American Birding Association standardized and regulated North American Big Years. The ABA Area was defined as the 49 continental U.S. states (excluding Hawaii), Canada, and the French islands of St. Pierre and Miquelon, plus adjacent waters to a distance of 200 miles from land or half the distance to a neighboring country, whichever distance is less.

Big year efforts were still few and far between. In 1973  Kenn Kaufman and Floyd Murdoch both pursued Parker's record. As recounted in Kaufman's book Kingbird Highway, both broke the old record by a wide margin. Murdoch finished with 669 in the newly described ABA area to Kaufman's 666. Murdoch's record was broken in 1979 by James M. Vardaman, who saw 699 species that year and travelled 161,332 miles. Benton Basham, in 1983, topped Vardaman's effort with 710 species. 1987 marked the second time that there was a competition during a single year, with Sandy Komito's 722 species topping Steve Perry's 711. In 1992 Bill Rydell made a serious attempt at the record and ended with 714 species for the year.

In 1998, three birders, Sandy Komito, Al Levantin, and Greg Miller, chased Komito's prior record of 722 birds. In the end Komito kept the record, listing 745 species birds plus 3 submitted in 1998 and later accepted by state committees for a revised total of 748. Mark Obmascik's book about the 1998 big year birders was adapted into the 2011 20th Century Fox film The Big Year.

In 2008, Lynn Barber, at the time the Texas big year record holder, became the first woman to break the 700-species barrier with a total of 723. In 2010, North Carolina birder Chris Hitt became the first birder to see 700+ species in the lower 48 in a single year, finishing with 704. In the same year, Virginia birder Robert Ake ended the year with 731 species, an extraordinary total achieved without the benefit of the relatively unique weather effects of 1998.

In 2011, Colorado birder John Vanderpoel became the fastest birder on record to reach 700 species in a year. Ultimately he managed 743 birds, missing out on the record by five, but completing what was, at the time, the 2nd-biggest ABA year ever. Vanderpoel's effort was the last made without the major contribution of eBird and birding groups on Facebook, which significantly enhanced the quality and quantity of rare bird alerts.

In 2013, Massachusetts birder Neil Hayward reluctantly decided to do an ABA big year. Hayward reached 700 species two weeks ahead of John Vanderpoel's 2011 pace, and ended his year on 747 species plus 3 provisionals. Two provisionals later accepted by the ABA gave Hayward a final total of 749, which set a new ABA Big Year record.

In 2016, an unprecedented four birders attempted simultaneous ABA Area big years. A South Dakotan doctor birding as "Olaf Danielson" launched his "Bad Weather Big Year", reaching 700 species in May. John Weigel, an Australian conservationist and Tasmanian devil activist, also launched his big year, called "Birding for Devils." While not seeking to break the record, American birding activist and blogger Christian Hagenlocher's "The Birding Project" aimed to attract more people to birding through a more social perspective. Hagenlocher, at age 27, also became the youngest person to break the 700-species barrier for an ABA big year. Photographer Laura Keene, conducting a 2016 photographic big year, broke Lynn Barber's Big Year record for women in September. 2016 marked the first time four birders had each seen over 700 species in the ABA Area in a year. On 16 July 2016, Weigel saw his 750th species, a Buller's shearwater, breaking Hayward's previous record. All four birders would eventually surpass Hayward's total.

In October 2016, the ABA voted to add the U.S. state of Hawaii to the countable area for ABA Big Years. All the 2016 big year birders except Hagenlocher birded Hawaii during November and December 2016, even though the "New" ABA checklist was not updated until November 2017. Olaf Danielson, partly due to efforts to promote bird conservation in Hawaii, incorporated Hawaii into his Big Year planning, keeping a list for the "New ABA" along with his Continental ABA list. John Weigel and Laura Keene subsequently birded Hawaii, with Weigel ending up with the highest total for the "New ABA" region (836), the Continental ABA region (784) and the United States (832). Danielson was close behind with 829 for the "New ABA," while setting a new record for the Lower 48 States (723). Weigel was nipping at his heels with 721. Keene shattered the previous record for photographed species with diagnostic photos of 792 species, and audio recordings of 10 others, out of her 815 total for the year.

2017 broke new ground, with five birders surpassing 700 species in the Continental ABA Area by September, and three breaking the 750-species barrier. Keene's women's record for the "New ABA" region was broken in 2017 by Yve Morrell. Also during 2017, Ruben and Victor Stoll became the first brothers to reach the 700 mark, and Richard and Gaylee Dean became the first married couple to reach 700.

In 2018, Nicole Koeltzow reached the 700-species milestone on July 1, while in August Gaylee and Richard Dean became the first birders to reach 700 species in consecutive years. On October 30, 2018, in Hawaii, Koeltzow became the 7th birder to reach the 800-species mark, and went on to set new ABA records for women birders. Also noteworthy in 2018 was the fact that Koeltzow and Dan Gesualdo became the 4th and 5th birders to identify 700+ species in the Lower 48 states. Gesualdo did so without a single airplane trip.

On July 4, 2019, John Weigel hit 700 for the second time, and on July 5 Gaylee and Richard Dean once again reached 700 species for the year, making them the first birders ever to top 700 species in the ABA Area three times. On top of that, the three years were done consecutively. At the end of July 2019 Weigel became the first birder to reach 750 species in more than one year. A trip to Alaska at the end of August 2019 allowed David and Tammy McQuade to become the 4th and 5th birders to reach 700 species during 2019. They joined the Deans as the only couples to accomplish the feat. With a trip to Maine in September Amanda Damin became the 6th birder to reach 700 for the year, an unprecedented occurrence in the history of ABA Big Years. In October 2019 Weigel became the first birder to have a second 800+ ABA Big Year, and Richard and Gaylee Dean became the 9th and 10th birders to have a 750+ ABA Big Year. In November 2019 David and Tammy McQuade became the 6th and 7th birders to identify 700+ species in the Lower 48, and in December 2019 Gaylee and Richard Dean became the 8th and 9th birders to accomplish that feat.
A new ABA Big Year record was set on December 23, 2019, when John Weigel found a Steller's Eider in Alaska, species #837 for the year. The same species also allowed Weigel to set a new record for a United States Big Year. At the close of the year he was at 836 for this category.

Big Years in 2020 were certainly impacted by the pandemic, as tours to Alaska were cancelled, travel to and from Canada was almost non-existent, and the use of air travel was minimal. At age 21, Ben Sanders was the youngest birder to reach 680 for a Lower 48 (Contiguous) Big Year, and did it without a single airplane trip. David and Tammy McQuade had 735 species, all in the "Lower 49" (the Lower 48 + Hawaii). Their total of 692 for the Lower 48 tied for 13th best all-time. The highlight of the year was in the Contiguous 48 States category, where Jeremy Dominguez broke Danielson's 2016 record; the Bar-tailed Godwit he had in Washington on December 29 was species #724 for the year.

Although the pandemic continued to affect Big Years in 2021, especially with regards to travel between the United States and Canada, five birders cracked the Top Ten for the Contiguous 48 States region. Most notably, on December 18 Tiffany Kersten tied the record for the Contiguous 48 States with Smith's Longspur as #724. She followed it up by heading to Texas, where she got the Bat Falcon on the same day. Since the Bat Falcon was not yet listed on the ABA Checklist, she officially set the new record on December 23, with Northern Lapwing. Charlie Bostwick had the 5th-highest Big Year for the ABA Region, the United States and the Contiguous 48 States. David McQuade, Tammy McQuade and Jason Vassallo also had exceptional Big Years for the Contiguous 48 States. With this, their third consecutive 700+ year, the McQuade's matched the Deans as the only birders with three years with 700 or more species.

2022 will certainly be a notable year. In July 2022 David and Tammy McQuade became the first birders to top 700 in four separate years. On July 22, Ruben and Victor Stoll had both Nelson's and Saltmarsh Sparrows at Maine's Scarborough Marsh, breaking Tiffany Kersten's record for the Contiguous 48 States; they ended the year with 750 species (plus a provisional Southern Lapwing). On October 19th, Mark O'Keefe reached 700 for the ABA Region. The milestone bird was the Variegated Flycatcher in his home state of Michigan. O'Keefe ended the year with 706, while Nathan Goldberg had 702 for the ABA Region.

ABA Area big year rankings

The ABA Area includes Canada, the 50 US states including Hawaii, the French islands of St. Pierre et Miquelon off Canada, and adjacent waters out to 200 nautical miles.

The provisional species for 2022 is Southern Lapwing.

Continental ABA Area big year rankings

This area is similar to the ABA Area (see above) but excludes Hawaii.
Prior to 2016 this was the "ABA Area." All records predating 2016 are based on this definition.

The provisional species for 2022 is Southern Lapwing.

United States big year rankings

The provisional species for 2022 is Southern Lapwing.

USA Contiguous 48 States big year rankings

The provisional species for 2022 is Southern Lapwing.

World big years

In 2008, British couple Alan Davies and Ruth Miller traveled around the world, seeing 4,341 species. In 2015, Oregon birder Noah Strycker launched a worldwide big year with the goal of seeing at least 5,000 species—roughly half of the world's species—as he traveled around the globe. On September 16, in India, he broke Davies' and Miller's existing record when he saw a Sri Lanka frogmouth for his 4,342nd species of the year. He finished the year with 6,042 bird species, his last species seen being an Oriental Bay Owl in Assam, India.

Strycker's record faced an immediate challenge in 2016 when Dutch birder Arjan Dwarshuis launched an effort to break it as well as raise money for the Birdlife Preventing Extinctions Programme. On November 4, 2016, Dwarshuis saw a tody motmot in Panama, breaking Strycker's previous record total. He finished the year with 6,852 seen bird species and this is the new World big year record.

Because Dwarshuis primarily used the IOC Checklist and Strycker the Clements Checklist, their totals are not fully compatible, as the IOC checklist lists a greater number of species. However, Dwarshuis and Strycker have both compiled checklists for each list.

Many world big year birders aim to minimize costs through a sponsorship, and their carbon footprint through a carbon offset program.

Alternative big years

Traditional big year birders have drawn criticism from environmentalists for failing to consider the ecological impact of their travel. Several birders have attempted "green", or alternative big years to raise awareness for both birding and the environment. 
 
In 2005, two British cycling birders decided to have a competition. Chris Mills in Norfolk, England and Simon Woolley, Hampshire, England competed over who would see the most birds by cycling only and hence become the UK Green Year list record holder. Chris Mills won setting a record of 251 bird species.

Starting in the summer of 2007, teenager Malkolm Boothroyd and his parents, Ken Madsen and Wendy Boothroyd, attempted a big year without the use of fossil fuels by planning to bicycle over 10,000 miles to get over 400 species for the year. They started in their home province of the Yukon Territory, rode down the Pacific Coast, looping back around Arkansas to catch the Texas spring migration, then eastward to Florida. They dubbed this attempt a "bird year," rather than a big year. In the end, they covered more than 13,000 miles by bicycle and tallied 548 species, raising more than $25,000 for bird conservation in the process.

2014 saw the first continent-wide "green year", a big year executed with a minimum of environmental impact. In his rather extreme instance, Dorian Anderson bicycled 17,830 miles around the United States, amassing a self-powered, petroleum-free 618 species during his 365 days on America's roads.  Dorian visited 28 states (some twice) during his adventure and, beyond his species total, raised $49,000 for habitat conservation. He shunned all motorized transportation for the entire adventure, refusing even ferries that would have saved him sometimes hundreds of miles of riding around various bodies of water. He was hit by a car once, and almost hit several other times, but  survived the entire year without major injury.

In 2021, Niky Carrera Levy and Mauricio Ossa, a couple of publicists and photographers made the first Big Year in Colombia, the country with the largest number of birds recorded in the world. They managed to record 1,453 species, the highest count of birds in one year in a single country. They traveled the 32 departments of Colombia in 21,974 miles. In addition to counting birds, they carried a message of conservation with the Colombian grebe, the only extinct species in Colombia and they got 789 children to take the oath of guardian of the birds.

Big year books
 Wild America (1955) by Roger Tory Peterson & James Fisher
 Call Collect, Ask for Birdman (1980) by James M. Vardaman
 Looking for the Wild (1986) by Lyn Hancock
 The Loonatic Journals (1987) by Steven Perry
 Birding's Indiana Jones: A Chaser's Diary (1990) by Sandy Komito
 The Feather Quest (1992) by Pete Dunne
 A Year for the Birds (1995) by William B. Rydell, Jr.
 Kingbird Highway: The Story of a Natural Obsession That Got a Little Out of Hand (1997) by Kenn Kaufman
 I Came, I Saw, I Counted (1999) by Sandy Komito
 Chasing Birds Across Texas: A Birding Big Year (2003) by Mark T. Adams
 The Big Year: A Tale of Man, Nature, and Fowl Obsession (2004) by Mark Obmascik (later the basis for a 2011 comedy film distributed by 20th Century Fox)
 Return to Wild America: A Yearlong Search for the Continent's Natural Soul (2005) by Scott Weidensaul
 The Big Twitch (2005) by Sean Dooley (an Australian "Big Year")
 Arrivals and Rivals by Adrian M. Riley (2005; 2nd edition 2007) 
 BirdWatchingWatching (2009) by Alex Horne
 The Biggest Twitch: Around the World in 4,000 Birds (2010) by Alan Davies and Ruth Miller
 Extreme Birder: One Woman's Big Year (2011) by Lynn E. Barber
 A Big Manhattan Year: Tales of Competitive Birding (2013) by David Barrett
 Boobies, Peckers & Tits: One Man's Naked Perspective (2014) by Olaf Danielson
 Lost Among the Birds: Accidentally Finding Myself in One Very Big Year (2016) by Neil Hayward
 Josh's Big Year: From Deserts to Jungles, a battle with Asperger's (2016) by Josh Crickmay 
 Birding Without Borders (2017) by Noah Strycker
 Een Bevlogen Jaar (2019) by Arjan Dwarshuis, published in Dutch by Meulenhoff
 Falcon Freeway: A Big Year of Birding on a Budget (2019) by Christian Hagenlocher
 Binoculars & Brushes: A year painting birds in the Welsh Marches (2019) by Julian Livsey
 Little Big Year: Chasing Acadia's Birds (2020) by Richard Wayne MacDonald
 Every Bird In Maine: One Man's Journey to See Every Bird in Maine (2021) by Ethan Whitaker
 Full Chase Mode (2021) by John W Vanderpoel
 The (Big) Year That Flew By (2023) by Arjan Dwarshuis, published by Chelsea Green

See also
World Series of Birding
List of birdwatchers
The Big Year, 2011 film

References

Birdwatching
Competitions
American Birding Association